The 1947 George Washington Colonials football team was an American football team that represented George Washington University as an independent during the 1947 college football season. In its second and final season under head coach Skip Stahley, the team compiled a 1–7–1 record (0–4 against conference records), finished 16th in the Southern Conference, and was outscored by a total of 177 to 92.

Schedule

References

George Washington
George Washington Colonials football seasons
George Washington Colonials football